James Salzman (born 1963) is the Donald Bren Distinguished Professor of Environmental Law with joint appointments at the UCLA School of Law and the Bren School of Environmental Science and Management at the University of California, Santa Barbara.

Salzman graduated from Yale College and Harvard Law School, the first Harvard graduate to earn joint degrees in law and engineering. Prior to joining the University of California in 2015, he taught as a chaired professor with joint appointments to the environment and laws schools at Duke University and American University, and as a visiting professor at Columbia, Harvard, Stanford and Yale and at universities in Australia, China, Israel, Italy, Portugal and Sweden. Publishing twelve books and over 100 articles, he is the fifth most cited scholar in environmental law, with over 110,000 downloads of his articles.

Prior to entering academia, he worked in Paris in the Environment Directorate of the Organization for Economic Cooperation and Development and in London as the European Environmental Manager for Johnson Wax. His honors include election as a Fellow of the Royal Geographical Society, as well as appointments as a McMaster Fellow and Fulbright Senior Scholar in Australia, a Gilbert White Fellow at Resources for the Future, and a Bellagio Fellow at the Rockefeller Foundation, among others. Twice voted Professor of the Year at Duke, he has lectured on every continent.

He is the author of Drinking Water: A History, and a frequent commentator in the media on drinking water issues. He has served on the United States Environmental Protection Agency's National Drinking Water Advisory Council and on the Environmental Protection Agency/United States Trade Representative's Trade and Environment Policy Advisory Committee. His bestselling book, Mine: How the Hidden Rules of Ownership Control Our Lives, was published in 2021 by Doubleday and positively reviewed in The New Yorker,, New York Times, and the Financial Times  among others.

Selected publications 
 What is the Emperor Wearing? The Secret Lives of Ecosystem Services, Pace Environmental Law Review 2011,
 The Next Generation of Trade and Environment Conflicts: The Rise of Green Industrial Policy, Northwestern University Law Review 2014
 Gaming the Past: The Theory and Practice of Historic Baselines in the Administrative State, Vanderbilt Law Review 2010
 Teaching Policy Instrument Choice in Environmental Law: The Five P's, Duke Environmental Law & Policy Forum 2013

References

1963 births
Living people
American legal scholars
American University faculty and staff
Duke University faculty
American environmental lawyers
Harvard Law School alumni
Harvard Law School faculty
UCLA School of Law faculty
University of California, Santa Barbara faculty
Yale College alumni